Aneura is a genus of flies in the family Mycetophilidae.

References 

 Zaitzev, A.I. 2001: The Sciaroidea (Diptera) (excluding Sciaridae) of New Zealand. I. Genus Aneura Marshall. International journal of dipterological research, 12(1): 33-42

External links 
 

 Aneura at insectoid.info

Mycetophilidae
Bibionomorpha genera